Tripti Mitra (née Bahaduri; 25 October 1925 – 24 May 1989) was a popular Indian actress of Bengali theatre and films, and wife of Sombhu Mitra, noted theatre director, with whom she co-founded pioneering theatre group Bohurupee in 1948. She has acted in films like Jukti Takko Aar Gappo and Dharti Ke Lal.

She was awarded Sangeet Natak Akademi Award, the highest Indian recognition given to practicing artists, given by Sangeet Natak Akademi, India's National Academy for Music, Dance and Drama in 1962 for Theatre acting, and the Padma Shri in 1971 by Government of India in Arts field.

Early life and education
Tripti Mitra was born in Dinajpur (British India) on 25 October 1925. Her father was Ashutosh Bhaduri and mother was Shailabala Debi. In Dinajpur Minor School she studied up to class six, then she came to Kolkata and got admission in Pyaricharan School. After passing Higher Secondary Examination from that school, she got admission in Ashutosh College. But she could not complete her studies since she got a job. She married Sombhu Mitra in December, 1945. She had a daughter Shaoli Mitra, who was an actress and director.

Career
Tripti Mitra had been acting in theatre since her teens. She first acted in her cousin Bijon Bhattacharya's play Agun (Fire) in 1943. After watching her stage performance in noted IPTA play, Nabanna (Harvest) based on Bengal famine of 1943, director Khwaja Ahmad Abbas took her to Bombay to act in Gana Natya Sangha’s film Dharti Ke Lal in 1943, partly based on the play. Her first Bengali film was Pathik in 1953, the film was directed by Debaki Kumar Basu. She also acted in Ritwik Ghatak's last film, Jukti Takko Aar Gappo (1974).

In 1948, Shombhu and Tripti Mitra founded their own theatre group named Bohurupee. She acted in innumerable plays mostly along with her husband Sombhu Mitra,a colossus in the field of theatre,  to become one of the most legendary beings of Bengali theatre, most famous for her role as Nandini, the protagonist of Rabindranath Tagore's Rakta Karabi. She also acted in Jago Hua Savera, a 1959 Urdu movie produced in Dhaka, East Pakistan (now Bangladesh), based on a Manik Bandopadhya's classic novel Padma Nadir Majhi.
Tripti Mitra died on 24 May 1989.

Filmography
Jukti Takko Aar Gappo (1974)
Charankabi Mukunda Das (1968)
Seba (1967)
Kanchanranga (1964)
Suryasnan (1962)
Manik (1961)
 The Day Shall Dawn (1959)
Shubha Bibaha (1959)
Asha (1956)
Joy Maa Kali Boarding (1955)
Rickshaw-Wala (1955)
Moyla Kagaj (1954)
Pathik (1953)
Bodhodoy (Short) (1951)
Gopinath (1948)
Dharti Ke Lal (1946)

Plays
Agun
Nabanna
Jabanbandi
Gopinath
Ulukhagra
Chaar Adhyay (based on Rabindranath Tagore's novella of the same name)
Rakta Karabi (Tagore's "Red Oleander")
Raja (Tagore's "The King of the dark chamber")
Baki Itihaas
Daakghor (she produced and directed Tagore's The Post Office (play))
Sutorang
Aparajita
Visarjan

Awards
Sangeet Natak Akademi Award in 1962
Padma Shri in 1971
Kalidas Samman by Madhya Pradesh Government in 1989

See also
Bengali theatre

References

External links
 

Indian film actresses
1925 births
1989 deaths
Actresses from Kolkata
Indian stage actresses
Actresses in Bengali cinema
Indian theatre directors
Indian People's Theatre Association people
Recipients of the Sangeet Natak Akademi Award
Recipients of the Padma Shri in arts
Asutosh College alumni
University of Calcutta alumni
Bengali theatre personalities
20th-century Indian actresses
Indian women theatre directors
Bengali actresses